The 2011 Houston Texans season was the franchise's 10th season in the National Football League and the 6th under head coach Gary Kubiak.  The Texans improved on their record from the 2010 season, despite losing starting quarterback Matt Schaub & backup Matt Leinart to season ending injuries. Third stringer T.J. Yates filled in, and earned the franchise's first playoff berth by defeating the Cincinnati Bengals 20–19 in Week 14 and clinching the AFC South. It also assured the Texans of at least one playoff game at home—the first NFL playoff game in Houston since 1993. After reaching the Divisional match against the Baltimore Ravens, the Texans suffered their maiden loss in the NFL Playoffs, losing 20–13.

Prior to the season, former Cowboys head coach Wade Phillips was hired as defensive coordinator, replacing Frank Bush who was terminated by Texans owner Bob McNair. The Texans defense made major improvements in Phillips' first year calling Houston's defensive plays. The team allowed the fourth-fewest points in the league in 2011 (compared to fourth most in 2010), the second-fewest yards allowed (third-most in 2010) and third-fewest yards per play (4.8, compared to 6.0, second-worst in 2010). Not only do the 2011 Texans hold the record for least points conceded in the average game of a season for the team with 17.4 points, which happened nine times, but they also got a +103 point differential, which is the best in franchise history. Of the Texans' 10 wins, 9 of them were decided by at least 6 points.

Offseason

2011 draft board

Staff

Final roster

Preseason

Regular season

Schedule

Note: Intra-division opponents are in bold text.

Game summaries

Week 1: vs. Indianapolis Colts

The Texans began their season at home against the AFC South division foes, Colts.  With the win, the Texans started the season out at 1–0.

Week 2: at Miami Dolphins

The Texans went on the road to face the Dolphins.  With the win, the Texans improved to 2–0.

Week 3: at New Orleans Saints

With the loss, the Texans fell to 2–1.

Week 4: vs. Pittsburgh Steelers

With the win, the Texans improved to 3–1.

Week 5: vs. Oakland Raiders

The day before the game Al Davis passed away at the age of 82 due to heart failure. Davis served as the Raiders' head coach from 1963 to 1965, part owner and general manager from 1966 to 1971, then became the team's principal owner in 1972, still serving as general manager. Additionally, Davis served as commissioner of the AFL in 1966. With the loss, the Texans fell to 3–2 and they lost both their second game and first home game against the Raiders.

Week 6: at Baltimore Ravens

With the loss, the Texans fell to 3–3.

Week 7: at Tennessee Titans

With the win, the Texans improved to 4–3.

Week 8: vs. Jacksonville Jaguars
Battle Red Day

With the win, the Texans improved to 5–3.

Week 9: vs. Cleveland Browns

With the win, the Texans improved to 6–3.

Week 10: at Tampa Bay Buccaneers

With the win, the Texans went on their bye week 7–3. However, Matt Schaub was lost for the season due to a Lisfranc injury on his right foot.

Week 12: at Jacksonville Jaguars

With the win, not only did the Texans improved to 8–3, but swept the Jaguars for the 1st time since 2006. With Matt Schaub suffering a lisfranc injury against Tampa Bay, Matt Leinart started at quarterback for the Texans. Leinart would go down against the Jaguars with a collarbone injury, with T. J. Yates stepping in at quarterback. Leinart finished the game going 10-of-13 for 57 yards with a touchdown.

Week 13: vs. Atlanta Falcons

Due to injuries to Matt Schaub and Matt Leinart, quarterback T. J. Yates made his first NFL start. With the win, the Texans improved to 9–3, securing the first winning season in franchise history.

Week 14: at Cincinnati Bengals

With the last-second win, the Texans improved to 10–3 and clinched the franchise's first playoff berth and AFC South division title.

Week 15: vs. Carolina Panthers

With the loss, the Texans' seven-game winning streak was snapped, falling to 10–4. Houston also lost to the Panthers for the first time in franchise history.

Week 16: at Indianapolis Colts

With the loss, the Texans fell to 10–5.

Week 17: vs. Tennessee Titans

T. J. Yates left the game after the Texans' first offensive drive with a bruised left shoulder. He was replaced by Jake Delhomme for the rest of the game. Houston scored a touchdown with 0:14 left to trail 22–23. To avoid overtime and further injuries, head coach Gary Kubiak decided to try a two-point conversion. Tight end Joel Dreessen was flagged for a false start, moving the Texans back 5 yards. The attempt would ultimately fail as backup center Thomas Austin snapped the ball over Delhomme. Neil Rackers would attempt an onside kick, but it was recovered by Lavelle Hawkins for the Titans, securing a win for Tennessee. With the loss, the Texans would end their season at 10–6 and the AFC's #3 seed.

Standings

Division

Conference

Postseason

Schedule

Game summaries

AFC Wild Card Playoffs: vs. (6) Cincinnati Bengals

Making their NFL postseason debut as the AFC's #3 seed, the Texans began their playoff run at home in the AFC Wild Card Round against the #6 Cincinnati Bengals, in a rematch of their Week 14 contest. Not only was this the Texans' first postseason game, it was the franchise's first game ever broadcast nationally on NBC, they were also the last NFL team to finally play on NBC, since their 2002 inception.

Houston trailed in the first quarter with Bengals running back Cedric Benson getting a 1-yard touchdown run, yet the Texans answered with an 8-yard touchdown run from running back Arian Foster.  Cincinnati struck back in the second quarter with kicker Mike Nugent getting a 37-yard field goal, but Houston took the lead with a 39-yard field goal from kicker Neil Rackers, followed by rookie defensive end J.J. Watt returning an interception 29 yards for a touchdown.  From there, the Texans took control with rookie quarterback T.J. Yates finding wide receiver Andre Johnson on a 40-yard touchdown in the third quarter, followed by a 42-yard touchdown run by Foster in the fourth quarter.

With the win, the Texans improved their overall record to 11–6.

AFC Divisional Playoffs: at (2) Baltimore Ravens

With the loss, the Texans finished the season with an overall record of 11–7.

Statistics

Team

Individual

Source:

References

Houston
2011 in sports in Texas
AFC South championship seasons
Houston Texans seasons